Cytochrophin-4 is an opioid peptide.

References

Opioid peptides